General elections were held in Southern Rhodesia on 19 September 1928, the second elections to the Legislative Assembly. The Rhodesia Party, which had won an overwhelming victory in the previous elections in 1924, was re-elected with a slightly reduced majority.

Electoral system
The Electoral Act, 1928 added a procedure whereby electors could vote by post, but otherwise retained the same system as used previously.

At this election the franchise was codified for the first time by the Electoral Act, 1928. The basis for the act was a consolidation of the previous regulations created by Order in Council, but the opportunity was taken by the Legislative Assembly to change some of the regulations which they had come to dislike. The principal change in the franchise was to restrict registration to British subjects only, whether by birth or naturalisation; previously, resident aliens could take an oath of allegiance to qualify themselves.

A change was also made to the literacy requirements for voters, where the test of writing fifty words of English at the dictation of the registering officer was dropped and the would-be voter merely had to be able to fill in the form in their own handwriting. The financial means qualification was the subject of a minor wording change, whereby the word "income" was added as an alternative to salary or wages.

Having previously elected the Legislative Assembly by means of 15 electoral districts each returning two members, in 1927 a Delimitation Board was established to recommend new districts. The Board intended to recommend 30 single-member districts, but found this to be impractical given the strong population growth around Salisbury and Bulawayo and therefore recommended 22 single-member districts and four two-member districts. The retention of two-member districts was controversial. The Board found its work hampered by the inaccuracy of the electoral roll, and as a result registration procedure was tightened up in the Electoral Act, 1928.

Political parties
The development of political parties had advanced since the colony was granted self-government. The Progressive Party, an opposition group opposed to monopolies and advocating more development of Matabeleland, had been formed in June 1927 from a group of independent members, and was able to nominate 22 candidates for the 30 seats. The Rhodesia Labour Party had increased its strength in the towns.

Also in 1927 the Country Party had been formed by dissident farmers in the Rhodesian Agricultural Union.

Results

By constituency

 CP – Centre Party
 Lab – Rhodesia Labour Party
 PP – Progressive Party
 RP – Rhodesia Party

Changes during the Assembly

Mazoe

John Wallace Downie gave up his seat on 28 October 1930 on his appointment as High Commissioner of Southern Rhodesia in London, precipitating a byelection in his electoral district which was held on 5 December 1930.

Salisbury South

Due to the resignation of Gordon Ross Milne who was in ill health, a byelection in this electoral district was held on 13 March 1931.

Gwelo

Max Danziger left the Rhodesia Party on 4 June 1931 and simultaneously decided to vacate his seat to test the opinion of his electors. The result of the election was:

Party changes
In October 1929 the Progressive Party merged with the Country Party to form the Reform Party.

References
 Source Book of Parliamentary Elections and Referenda in Southern Rhodesia 1898–1962 ed. by F.M.G. Willson (Department of Government, University College of Rhodesia and Nyasaland, Salisbury 1963)
 Holders of Administrative and Ministerial Office 1894–1964 by F.M.G. Willson and G.C. Passmore, assisted by Margaret T. Mitchell (Source Book No. 3, Department of Government, University College of Rhodesia and Nyasaland, Salisbury 1966)

Elections in Southern Rhodesia
Southern Rhodesia
1928 in Southern Rhodesia
Southern Rhodesia
Election and referendum articles with incomplete results